Kartvelia may refer to:

 Georgia, a country in the Caucasus. Georgia is known as "Sakartvelo" in Georgian, which would be literally translated as "Kartvelia" in English.
 781 Kartvelia, a minor planet orbiting the Sun named after Georgia.

See also 
 Kartvelian